Viktor Ivanovich Shalimov (Russian: Виктор Иванович Шалимов; born April 20, 1951 in Solnechnogorsk, Soviet Union) is a retired ice hockey player who played in the Soviet Hockey League.  He played for HC Spartak Moscow.  He was inducted into the Russian and Soviet Hockey Hall of Fame in 1975. He scored 66 goals in his 126 career games for the Soviet national team. He played in the 1976 Winter Olympics and was one of the top scorers of the tournament.

External links

Soviet Hockey Hall of Fame page

1951 births
HC Spartak Moscow players
Ice hockey players at the 1976 Winter Olympics
Living people
Olympic gold medalists for the Soviet Union
Olympic ice hockey players of the Soviet Union
Olympic medalists in ice hockey
People from Solnechnogorsky District
Soviet ice hockey right wingers
Sportspeople from Moscow Oblast